Otacílio Brito Alves, also known as Cafu (born 22 January 1996), is a Brazilian professional footballer who plays as a midfielder for Portuguesa-RJ.

Career
Born in Niterói, Cafu joined the youth side of Flamengo in 2010. On 5 September 2016 it was announced that he had signed on loan with Mumbai City of the Indian Super League. He made his professional debut for the club on 3 October 2016 against Pune City. He came on as a 73rd minute substitute for Matías Defederico as Mumbai City won 1–0.

Career statistics

References

External links 
 Indian Super League Profile.
 Cafu at ZeroZero

1996 births
Living people
Sportspeople from Niterói
Brazilian footballers
Brazilian expatriate footballers
Association football midfielders
Brazil under-20 international footballers
CR Flamengo footballers
Mumbai City FC players
Ceará Sporting Club players
Botafogo Futebol Clube (SP) players
G.D. Estoril Praia players
Esporte Clube São Bento players
Associação Atlética Portuguesa (RJ) players
Campeonato Brasileiro Série A players
Campeonato Brasileiro Série B players
Campeonato Brasileiro Série C players
Indian Super League players
Liga Portugal 2 players
Expatriate footballers in India
Expatriate footballers in Portugal
Brazilian expatriate sportspeople in India
Brazilian expatriate sportspeople in Portugal